Tomáš Gřeš (born 16 February 1996) is a Czech ice hockey forward currently playing for HC Olomouc of the Czech Extraliga.

References

External links
 

HC Vítkovice players
Czech ice hockey forwards
1996 births
Living people
HC Olomouc players
Sportspeople from Ostrava
AZ Havířov players
HC RT Torax Poruba players